Sportivnaya is a station of the Samara Metro on First Line which was opened on 25 March 1993.

References

Samara Metro stations
Railway stations in Russia opened in 1993
Railway stations located underground in Russia